2595 km is a rural locality (a railway station) in Cheremnovskoye Rural Settlement of Nazyvayevsky District, Russia. The population was 39 as of 2010.

Streets 
 Vokzalnaya
 Putevaya

References 

Rural localities in Omsk Oblast